Olav Holt (born 7 January 1935) is a Norwegian physicist.

Holt was born in Hedrum, and took his dr.philos. degree in 1963. Holt is a specialist in the upper atmosphere physics and radio wave propagation in the ionosphere.

Later, Holt was hired as professor at the University of Tromsø in 1969, where he served as rector from 1973 to 1977. He is a fellow of the Norwegian Academy of Technological Sciences. In 2003 he was proclaimed Knight, First Class of the Royal Norwegian Order of St. Olav.

His wife is Tordis Holt and he is the father of the Norwegian bestselling author and former Minister of Justice Anne Holt, and the Cardiologist Dr.med. Even Holt.

References

1935 births
Living people
People from Larvik
Norwegian physicists
Academic staff of the University of Tromsø
Rectors of the University of Tromsø
Members of the Norwegian Academy of Technological Sciences